Blair Catherine Evans (born 3 April 1991) is an Australian middle distance freestyle swimmer.

Career 
Evans made her international debut for Australia at the 2009 World Aquatics Championships where she competed in the 800-metre freestyle, after winning her first senior national title in that event in that year.

She represented Australia at the 2010 Pan Pacific Swimming Championships, where she took bronze in the 200-metre and 400-metre freestyle, and silver in the 4×200-metre freestyle.

She represented Australia at the 2010 Commonwealth Games, winning a gold medal in the 4×200-metre freestyle relay, finishing sixth in the 200-metre freestyle, finishing fifth in the 800-metre freestyle, and finishing fourth in the 400-metre individual medley.

At the 2011 World Championships, she was part of the Australian 4 x 200 m women's team that won silver.

2012 Summer Olympics
At the 2012 Summer Olympics, Evans competed in the 400-metre individual medley, but finished 13th overall in the heats (6th in her heat) with a time of 4:40:42, and did not advance to the finals, as only the top 8 were selected.  Evans swam in the 4×200-metre freestyle relay qualifications heat.  Although she did not swim in the final, her team came in second with a time of 7:44.41, therefore Evans won a silver medal.

2016 Summer Olympics
At the 2016 Summer Olympics, Evans placed seventh in Heat 5 of the Women's 400m Individual Medley with a time of 4:38.91. She did not win a medal during the 2016 Rio games.

At the 2018 Commonwealth Games, Evans competed in the 200 and 400 m individual medley events, winning bronze in the 400 m individual medley.

See also
 List of Olympic medalists in swimming (women)

References

External links
 
  (archive 2)
 
 
 
 

1991 births
Living people
Commonwealth Games gold medallists for Australia
Swimmers at the 2010 Commonwealth Games
Swimmers from Perth, Western Australia
Australian female freestyle swimmers
World Aquatics Championships medalists in swimming
Australian female medley swimmers
Swimmers at the 2012 Summer Olympics
Olympic swimmers of Australia
Olympic silver medalists for Australia
Medalists at the FINA World Swimming Championships (25 m)
Medalists at the 2012 Summer Olympics
Swimmers at the 2016 Summer Olympics
Olympic silver medalists in swimming
Commonwealth Games medallists in swimming
Swimmers at the 2018 Commonwealth Games
21st-century Australian women
Medallists at the 2010 Commonwealth Games
Medallists at the 2018 Commonwealth Games